"Moves like Jagger" is a song by American band Maroon 5 featuring American singer Christina Aguilera. It was released on June 21, 2011, as the fourth and final single from the re-release of the group's third studio album Hands All Over (2010). The song was written by Adam Levine, Ammar Malik, Benny Blanco, and Shellback; the latter two are also the producers. "Moves like Jagger" is an electropop song with modern disco style elements and is backed by synths and electronic drums. The lyrics refer to a male's ability to impress a love interest with his dance moves, which he compares to those of Mick Jagger, the lead singer of the Rolling Stones.

"Moves like Jagger" was well received by music critics, who praised the song's chorus. Praise also went to the vocals of Levine and Aguilera, with critics pointing out solid chemistry between the two. Likewise, the song was a commercial success, going on to top the charts in over 18 countries. In the United States, "Moves like Jagger" became the band's second (after 2007's "Makes Me Wonder") and Aguilera's fifth number-one single and is among the best-selling singles of all time. The song also made Aguilera the second female artist to score a number-one hit in the 1990s, 2000s, and 2010s, which in turn made her the fourth woman to score number-one singles in three different decades.

The music video was directed by Jonas Åkerlund. The video features old video footage of Jagger and his iconic dance moves. "Moves like Jagger" was nominated for a Grammy Award for Best Pop Duo/Group Performance at the 54th Grammy Awards but lost to "Body and Soul" by Tony Bennett and Amy Winehouse. The song was first performed in June 2011 on an episode of The Voice (where Levine and Aguilera both served as coaches).

Internationally, the song was the ninth-best-selling digital single of 2011 with sales of 7 million copies. After Wham!'s "Last Christmas" finally topped the charts in 2021, "Moves like Jagger" became the UK's biggest-selling single never to top the charts. The song was certified Diamond by the Recording Industry Association of America (RIAA) in 2021.

Background and development
"Moves like Jagger" was written and produced by Benjamin Levin, also known as Benny Blanco, and Shellback, while additional writing was done by Adam Levine. When asked about the song, Levine said, "It was one of those songs that was definitely a risk; it's a bold statement. We've never really released a song like that. But it's exciting to do something different, do something new. I'm just happy everyone likes it." Some media outlets noted that Levine looked outside his own band for songwriting assistance which Levine responded to saying, "What I've learned from the recent few months is that it's OK to collaborate with other songwriters [...] I was always kind of staunchly opposed to it in the past, I think almost to a fault. I think I've got a lot to offer as a songwriter, but everybody hits a wall". He went on to praise Mick Jagger, the inspiration for the song saying,
"Jagger has the moves like Jagger. That being said, if there was ever someone to aspire to, I don't think anyone could claim to have the moves like James Brown, or the moves like Michael Jackson, or the moves like Prince [...] There's something about the way [Jagger] moves that is uniquely his own and hard to imitate, but also accessible and silly and fun, and not taking itself too seriously".
On adding Christina Aguilera to the song, Levine stated that "there's a lot of bravado in this song" and that their idea was that "if [they] could share vocals with a female, it would kind of curb the cockiness a little bit in a way that was more welcoming". Levine went on to say praise Aguilera stating that, "Christina is an incredible singer. There aren't many people out there that can sing like she can. And that was definitely like, well, let's just - let's have her really knock this out. And she did it in two seconds".

Composition
"Moves like Jagger" is a disco and electropop song. It features a "throbbing" synth, fast-paced beat and electronic drums. Robbie Daw from Idolator wrote that "Moves like Jagger" slightly echoes The Rolling Stones' chart-topping 1978 classic "Miss You", and added that "Levine's voice is distorted via Auto-Tune on the chorus." The song is introduced by a whistle melody and light, funky guitar in the key of B minor with a tempo of 128 beats per minute. Levine tries his best to impress his female interest with dance moves like The Rolling Stones frontman Mick Jagger singing, "I don't need to try to control you / Look into my eyes and I'll own you / With the moves like Jagger / I got the moves like Jagger / I got the moves like Jagger."

Aguilera appears midway through the song's bridge, playing her role as a tease with a self-written verse, "You want to know how to make me smile / Take control, own me just for the night / But if I share my secret / You gonna have to keep it / Nobody else can see this." Aguilera's contributions to the song consists of two interchangeable verses directly referencing her own song "Genie in a Bottle" from her debut album, Christina Aguilera (1999) with the lyrics, "Rub me right". Some critics panned the song for Aguilera's verse being too short comparing it to her 2001 effort on "Lady Marmalade".

Reception

Critical reception
Upon release, the song received generally positive reviews. Bill Lamb from About.com gave the song a positive review, giving the single four-and-a-half out of five stars. Lamb wrote that, "The funky, whistle driven melody here is loose, light, and irresistibly funky. The punchy guest vocal from fellow judge Christina Aguilera is simply icing on the cake. There is a real vocal chemistry between Aguilera and Levine." Lamb called the song an "outstanding summer song", writing that "It is light, danceable, and would sound great in the car with the top down." He went on to say, "An infectious whistle melody kicks things off with light, funky guitar and we're on our way to a great summer song. Maroon 5's Adam Levine guides us into the song with a trademark blend of soulful and slightly aloof. Later the throaty sound of Christina Aguilera grounds "Moves like Jagger" making it all a near perfect summer of 2011 audio treat". 

Robbie Daw from Idolator wrote that "It takes a full two minutes and 15 seconds for Christina's soulful pipes to begin trilling on "Moves like Jagger." But once she does, she immediately steals the show." Daw concluded by writing that "this is the best thing from either of these two in years."

Rolling Stone noted that, "The Voice judges [...] start off the song as an easygoing R&B-inflected pop tune before Aguilera showed up near the end to kick it all into high gear with her brassy, super-charged voice. As on the show, the two singers have a terrific chemistry, with Levine's chill vibe acting as the perfect counterbalance to the diva's fiery intensity". While naming the song "a contender for 2011's song of the summer", 

James Dinh from MTV Newsroom wrote that "Adam Levine and Christina Aguilera have turned their friendly rivalry on NBC's The Voice into some studio chemistry." Robert Copsey wrote for Digital Spy: "Take me by the tongue and I'll know you/ Kiss me till you're drunk and I'll show you," Ad insists over a funky, finger-clicking bassline and an irresistible whistle hook that immediately burrows deep into the recesses of your brain. "If I share my secret/ You're gonna have to keep it," Christina says on her short, sweet and perfectly formed cameo. We've already got your number, love, but our surprise is still 100% genuine."

Jagger himself acknowledged the song in an interview, calling the concept "very flattering." The song was ranked number three on BBC Radio 2's most played songs of the 2010s. In 2022, Billboard and American Songwriter ranked the song number three and number four, respectively, on their lists of the 10 greatest Maroon 5 songs.

Accolades

Commercial performance

On the issue dated July 9, 2011, "Moves like Jagger" debuted at number eight on the United States Billboard Hot 100, and topped it in the week ending September 10, 2011, as the greatest airplay gainer for the third consecutive week. It spent 10 weeks in the top 3. For Maroon 5, with prior top hits, this is the first time at the number-one position and top 10 on the Hot 100 chart since their single "Makes Me Wonder" in 2007. For Aguilera, this is her fifth number-one position, her first since "Lady Marmalade" in 2001. Incidentally, Levine is the first artist to achieve both the number-one position on the Hot 100 as a member of a band and reach the top 10 as a solo artist in the same week, as Gym Class Heroes' "Stereo Hearts" reached number 10. 

"Moves like Jagger" made Aguilera the fourth female artist, behind Janet Jackson and Madonna (1980s, 1990s, and 2000s) and Britney Spears (1990s, 2000s, and 2010s), to top the Hot 100 in three decades, as well as the eighth artist overall. During the week of October 1, 2011, the song advanced to number one on the Hot 100 Airplay. By March 2013, it had sold over 6 million digital copies in the United States.

On August 1, 2011, "Moves like Jagger" reached number two on the Australian ARIA Charts, making it Aguilera's highest charting single since "Candyman" in 2007, and held the runner-up spot for ten straight weeks. On the week of August 20, 2011, the song topped the Canadian Hot 100 chart, becoming the band's second number-one single and Aguilera's third number-one single, first in almost nine years (the last one was the 2002 hit "Beautiful").

"Moves like Jagger" made its debut on the UK Singles Chart at number three and sold 56,000 copies on the issue dated August 21, 2011, becoming Maroon 5's 4th top 10 hit and Aguilera's 15th top 10 hit in the UK. Starting at the issue date September 10, it peaked at number two for seven consecutive weeks, equaling the all-time UK record held by All-4-One's "I Swear" for the longest stay at number two by a hit not to reach number one. 

On October 5, 2011, the song reached number one in the mid-week chart update but failed to reach the number-one spot the following Sunday due to the mid-week release of Rihanna's new single "We Found Love" which debuted at number one keeping "Moves like Jagger" away from the number-one position. In the first six of these weeks it was held off the top of the chart by six different number-one singles consecutively, each of which debuted directly ahead of it; this after having already been held at number three behind two different pairs of new entries in its first two weeks on the chart. 

After spending seven straight weeks at number two in the singles charts without ever managing to claim the number-one spot, it ironically peaked at number two in the year end chart of 2011's bestselling singles as well. It became the biggest-selling song not to peak at number one in 2012. As of September 2017, "Moves like Jagger" has sold 1,536,000 copies in the United Kingdom, in an uninterrupted 52-week run in the chart.

Music video

Background
The music video for "Moves like Jagger" was directed by Jonas Åkerlund and filmed in the Los Angeles Theater, Los Angeles, California on July 8, 2011. On July 9, Aguilera posted an image of herself from the video shoot via Twitter, saying, "Always great to see Jonas Akerlund. He created the perfect feel for the song. Expect a fun video." The image showed Aguilera performing with a band in front of a background of the American flag. Four shirtless images of Levine from the shoot were also released online the same day. The Rolling Stones frontman Mick Jagger made an appearance in the video "via archive footage". The video features an incorrect, simplified version of the Union Flag as a backdrop for parts of the song. For Levine and his bandmates, the song and video are all about exposing a new generation to the rock legend. "We were lucky enough to get Mick's endorsement [for the video], as far as him giving us access to a bunch of different footage that's so cool," Levine told MTV News when they visited the video's set last month. "Not many people have seen [it], especially a newer generation of people that don't know so much about how incredible he was." The video premiered on August 8, 2011 on E! and was released the following day on YouTube. That same month, the band also released three version of the same music video, those being an explicit version, a version in 720p and a band edit of the original video. As of January 2023, all music videos of Moves Like Jagger have received a combined 811 million views on YouTube.

Synopsis

The video opens with black-and-white footage of the theater, shots of work crews assembling lighting and equipment onstage and groups of extras getting into costume, warming up for a shoot. This is followed by classic footage of Jagger, during which Michael Parkinson asks The Rolling Stones frontman how long he plans to make music. "I don't know. I never thought I'd be doing it for two years even," a young Jagger says, as the opening whistles of the Maroon 5 song kick in, throughout which a slew of Jagger lookalikes are shown dancing up to a central microphone, interlaced with archival footage of Jagger himself and shots of band members James Valentine, Jesse Carmichael, Michael Madden and Matt Flynn. When Maroon 5 frontman Adam Levine eventually appears, he is shirtless, tattooed and wearing tight black pants. The video is mostly a mash-up of people trying to move like Jagger, including Levine. When Aguilera makes her brief appearance, she is dressed for a retro look with mascara-heavy lashes and a floppy hat.

Reception
The Huffington Post commented "We weren't sure whether Levine and Aguilera would be able to bring it like Mick, but then again, no one can ever touch the original. The best they can do is try to imitate Jagger's greatness—and Levine and Aguilera do a pretty solid job of that."

Live performances
"Moves like Jagger" was performed for the first time with Aguilera on June 21, 2011, during The Voice, a talent competition show on which both she and Levine were coaches. Maroon 5 performed this song without Aguilera on America's Got Talent on August 3, 2011 in the results show of the fourth week of the Hollywood performances and the morning talk show The Today Show on August 5. The band later performed this song on Hands All Over Tour and the 2011 Summer Tour. On September 8, 2011, the song was performed live at the NFL pre-show on Lambeau Field in Green Bay, Wisconsin, before the start of the 2011 NFL season.

The song was also played during the band's appearances on The Ellen DeGeneres Show (September 21) and Saturday Night Live (November 5). On October 1, the band played the song at the Rock in Rio concert in Rio de Janeiro. In November 2011, Maroon 5 performed "Moves like Jagger" for the 2011 American Music Awards with Aguilera (the latter two along with a live performance of Gym Class Heroes's "Stereo Hearts" featuring Levine) and the 2011 Victoria's Secret Fashion Show. On November 13, 2011, Maroon 5 performed the song live at the Carnival Cruise Line, after the arrival of cruise ship Carnival Magic in Galveston, Texas. In June 2012, the band played with the song at the Ed Sullivan Theater in New York, as part of the Live on Letterman concert series.

On February 3, 2019, Maroon 5 performed the song for the Super Bowl LIII halftime show in Atlanta, Georgia. On October 1, 2022, the band performed "Moves like Jagger" for a benefit concert titled The Event, at MGM Grand Garden Arena in Las Vegas, Nevada.

Track listings

Charts

Weekly charts

Year-end charts

Decade-end charts

All-time charts

Certifications and sales

Release history

Mac Miller remix
The song's official remix features both Aguilera and Pittsburgh-based rapper Mac Miller. It was first made available on September 29, 2011, via hip hop website HipHopDX.com, before being released officially via iTunes on October 4. The remix remains largely unchanged from the original song, with Miller's two verses each coming at the beginning of the track and prior to Aguilera's refrain respectively. Miller was asked to appear on the remix of "Moves like Jagger" by producer Benny Blanco, following consultation with Maroon 5 frontman Adam Levine. Blanco noted that,
"We were listening to [the song] and I was like, 'Yo, who could we put on this song?', because we were trying to get someone to do a remix. I was like, 'I know exactly who', because I just put Mac on another remix".
Miller later said that he hoped to be involved in an official music video for the track, but no video was announced, until his death in September 2018.

See also 
 List of best-selling singles in Australia

References

2011 singles
2011 songs
Maroon 5 songs
Christina Aguilera songs
Songs written by Benny Blanco
Songs written by Adam Levine
Songs written by Shellback (record producer)
Song recordings produced by Benny Blanco
Song recordings produced by Shellback (record producer)
Billboard Hot 100 number-one singles
Canadian Hot 100 number-one singles
Irish Singles Chart number-one singles
Electropop songs
Number-one singles in Austria
Number-one singles in Denmark
Number-one singles in Finland
Number-one singles in Hungary
Number-one singles in New Zealand
Number-one singles in Norway
Number-one singles in Poland
Number-one singles in Russia
Number-one singles in Scotland
Number-one singles in Sweden
Record Report Pop Rock General number-one singles
A&M Octone Records singles
Mick Jagger
Music videos directed by Jonas Åkerlund
Songs written by Ammar Malik
Songs about dancing
Songs about musicians
Cultural depictions of the Rolling Stones
Male–female vocal duets
Nu-disco songs